Anqua is a village in Tuscany, central Italy, administratively a frazione of the comune of Radicondoli, province of Siena. At the time of the 2001 census its population was 6.

References 

Frazioni of the Province of Siena